Robert Clark was an American politician. He served as the eighteenth mayor of Lancaster, Pennsylvania from 1890 to 1894.

References

Mayors of Lancaster, Pennsylvania